Te Kere Ngatai-e-rua  (?–1901) was a notable New Zealand tohunga. Of Māori descent, he identified with the Te Ati Haunui-a-Paparangi iwi.

References

1901 deaths
New Zealand Māori religious leaders
Te Āti Haunui-a-Pāpārangi people
Tohunga
Year of birth missing